{{Infobox royalty|name = ‘Umarعمر
| title       = 
| succession  = 2nd Caliph of the Rashidun Caliphate
| reign       = 23 August 634 – 3 November 644
| image       = 20131203 Istanbul 118.jpg
| caption     = Calligraphic seal featuring Umar's name, on display in the Hagia Sophia
| predecessor = Abu Bakr
| successor   = Uthman
| birth_date  = 
| birth_place = Mecca, Hejaz, Arabia 
| death_date  = 
 (Dhu al-Hijjah 23 or Muharram 24 AH)
| death_place = Medina, Hejaz, Rashidun Caliphate 
| burial_place = Prophet's Mosque, Medina
| spouse      = 
| issue       = 
| issue-link  = Family tree of Umar#Descendants
| issue-pipe  = (among others)
| house       = Quraysh (Banu Adi)
| house-type  = Tribe
| father      = Al-Khattab ibn Nufayl
| mother      = Hantamah bint Hisham
| religion    = Islam
| module      = {{Infobox Arabic name
|embed=yes
|ism=ʿUmar
|nasab=ʿUmar ibn al-Khaṭṭāb ibn Nufayl ibn ʿAbd al-ʿUzzā ibn Rāz ibn ʿAdiyy ibn Kaʿab ibn Luʿayy ibn Ghālib ibn Fihr ibn Mālik
|kunya= Abul Hafs
|laqab= Al-Fārūq ("the distinguisher (between right and wrong)")}}
| signature   = Signature Believed To Be Of ʿUmar B. Al-Khaṭṭāb.png
}}

ʿUmar ibn al-Khaṭṭāb (also spelled Omar) was the second Rashidun caliph, ruling from August 634 until his assassination in 644. He succeeded Abu Bakr as the second caliph of the Rashidun Caliphate on 23 August 634. Umar was a senior companion and father-in-law of the Islamic prophet Muhammad. He was also an expert Muslim jurist known for his pious and just nature, which earned him the epithet Al-Fārūq ("the one who distinguishes (between right and wrong)").

Umar initially opposed Muhammad, his distant Qurayshite kinsman and later son-in-law. Following his conversion to Islam in 616, he became the first Muslim to openly pray at the Kaaba. Umar participated in almost all battles and expeditions under Muhammad, who bestowed the title al-Fārūq (the Distinguisher) upon Umar, for his judgements. After Muhammad's death in June 632, Umar pledged allegiance to Abu Bakr as the first caliph and served as the closest adviser to the latter until August 634, when the dying Abu Bakr nominated Umar as his successor.

Under Umar, the caliphate expanded at an unprecedented rate, ruling the Sasanian Empire and more than two-thirds of the Byzantine Empire. His attacks against the Sasanian Empire resulted in the conquest of Persia in less than two years (642–644). According to Jewish tradition, Umar set aside the Christian ban on Jews and allowed them into Jerusalem and to worship. Umar was assassinated by the Persian slave Abu Lu'lu'a Firuz in 644.

Umar is generally viewed by historians to be one of the most powerful and influential Muslim caliphs in history. He is revered in the Sunni Islamic tradition as a great just ruler and paragon of Islamic virtues, and some hadiths identify him as the second greatest of the Sahabah after Abu Bakr. He is viewed negatively in the Twelver Shia tradition.

Early life
Umar was born in Mecca to the Banu Adi clan, which was responsible for arbitration among the tribes. His father was Khattab ibn Nufayl and his mother was Hantama bint Hisham, from the tribe of Banu Makhzum. In his youth he used to tend to his father's camels in the plains near Mecca. His merchant father was famed for his intelligence among his tribe. Umar himself said: "My father, al-Khattab, was a ruthless man. He used to make me work hard; if I didn't work he used to beat me and he used to work me to exhaustion."

Despite literacy being uncommon in pre-Islamic Arabia, Umar learned to read and write in his youth. Though not a poet himself, he developed a love for poetry and literature. According to the tradition of Quraish, while still in his teenage years, Umar learned martial arts, horse riding and wrestling. He was tall, physically powerful and a renowned wrestler.Muhammad ibn Jarir al-Tabari, History of the Prophets and Kings He was also a gifted orator who succeeded his father as an arbitrator among the tribes.

Umar became a merchant and made several journeys to Rome and Persia, where he is said to have met various scholars and analyzed Roman and Persian societies. As a merchant he was unsuccessful.Tabqat ibn Sa'ad. Chapter: Umar ibn Khattab. Like others around him, Umar was fond of drinking in his pre-Islamic days.

Early military career

Opposition to Islam
In 610, Muhammad started preaching the message of Islam. However, like many others in Mecca, Umar opposed Islam and even threatened to kill Muhammad. He resolved to defend the traditional polytheistic religion of Arabia. He was adamant and cruel in opposing Muhammad, and very prominent in persecuting Muslims. He recommended Muhammad's death. He firmly believed in the unity of the Quraish and saw the new faith of Islam as a cause of division and discord.

Due to persecution, Muhammad ordered some of his followers to migrate to Abyssinia. When a small group of Muslims migrated, Umar became worried about the future unity of the Quraish and decided to have Muhammad assassinated.

 Conversion to Islam and service under Muhammad 
Umar converted to Islam in 616, one year after the Migration to Abyssinia.
The story was recounted in Ibn Ishaq's Sīrah. On his way to murder Muhammad, Umar met his best friend Nu'aym ibn Abd Allah who had secretly converted to Islam but had not told Umar. When Umar informed him that he had set out to kill Muhammad, Nu'aym said, “By God, you have deceived yourself, O Umar! Do you think that Banu Abd al-Manaf would let you run around alive once you had killed their son Muhammad? Why don't you return to your own house and at least set it straight?"

Nuaimal Hakim told him to inquire about his own house where his sister and her husband had converted to Islam. Upon arriving at her house, Umar found his sister and brother-in-law Saeed bin Zaid (Umar's cousin) reciting the verses of the Quran from sura Ta-Ha. He started quarreling with his brother-in-law. When his sister came to rescue her husband, he also started quarreling with her. Yet still they kept on saying "you may kill us but we will not give up Islam". Upon hearing these words, Umar slapped his sister so hard that she fell to the ground bleeding from her mouth. When he saw what he did to his sister, he calmed down out of guilt and asked his sister to give him what she was reciting. His sister replied in the negative and said "You are unclean, and no unclean person can touch the Scripture." He insisted, but his sister was not prepared to allow him to touch the pages unless he washed his body. Umar at last gave in. He washed his body and then began to read the verses that were: Verily, I am Allah: there is no God but Me; so serve Me (only), and establish regular prayer for My remembrance (Quran 20:14). He wept and declared, "Surely this is the word of Allah. I bear witness that Muhammad is the Messenger of Allah." On hearing this, Khabbab came out from inside and said: "O, Umar! Glad tidings for you. Yesterday Muhammad prayed to Allah, 'O, Allah! Strengthen Islam with either Umar or Abu Jahl, whomsoever Thou likest.' It seems that his prayer has been answered in your favour."

Umar then went to Muhammad with the same sword he intended to kill him with and accepted Islam in front of him and his companions. Umar was 39 years old when he accepted Islam.

According to one account, after his conversion to Islam Umar openly prayed at the Kaaba as the Quraish chiefs, Abu Jahl and Abu Sufyan, reportedly watched in anger. This further helped the Muslims to gain confidence in practicing Islam openly. At this stage Umar even challenged anyone who dared to stop the Muslims from praying, although no one dared to interfere with Umar when he was openly praying.

Umar's conversion to Islam granted power to the Muslims and to the Islamic faith in Mecca. It was after this event that Muslims offered prayers openly in Masjid al-Haram for the first time. Abdullah ibn Masud said,

 Migration to Medina 
In 622 CE, due to the safety offered by Yathrib (later renamed Medīnat an-Nabī, or simply Medina), Muhammad ordered his followers to migrate to Medina. Most Muslims migrated at night fearing Quraish resistance, but Umar is reported to have left openly during the day saying: "Any one who wants to make his wife a widow and his children orphans should come and meet me there behind that cliff." Umar migrated to Medina accompanied by his cousin and brother-in-law Saeed ibn Zaid.

 Life in Medina 

When Muhammad arrived in Medina, he paired each immigrant (Muhajir) with one of the residents of the city (Ansari), joining Muhammad ibn Maslamah with Umar, making them brothers in faith. Later in Umar's reign as caliph, Muhammad ibn Muslamah would be assigned the office of Chief Inspector of Accountability.
Muslims remained in peace in Medina for approximately a year before the Quraish raised an army to attack them.
In 624, Umar participated in the first battle between Muslims and Quraish of Mecca i.e., the Battle of Badr. In 625, he took part in the Battle of Uhud. In the second phase of the battle, when Khalid ibn Walid's cavalry attacked the Muslim rear, turning the tide of battle, rumours of Muhammad's death were spread and many Muslim warriors were routed from the battlefield, Umar among them. However, hearing that Muhammad was still alive, he went to Muhammad at the mountain of Uhud and prepared for the defence of the hill.
Later in the year Umar was a part of a campaign against the Jewish tribe of Banu Nadir.
In 625, Umar's daughter Hafsah was married to Muhammad.
Later in 627, he participated in the Battle of the Trench and also in the Battle of Banu Qurayza. In 628, Umar witnessed the Treaty of Hudaybiyyah.
In 628, he fought in the Battle of Khaybar. In 629, Muhammad sent Amr ibn al-A’as to Zaat-ul-Sallasal, after which, Muhammad sent Abu Ubaidah ibn al-Jarrah with reinforcements, including Abu Bakr and Umar, whereupon they attacked and defeated the enemy.
In 630, when Muslim armies rushed for the conquest of Mecca, he was part of that army. Later in 630, he fought in the Battle of Hunayn and the Siege of Ta'if. He was part of the Muslim army that contested the Battle of Tabouk under Muhammad's command and he was reported to have given half of his wealth for the preparation of this expedition. He also participated in the farewell Hajj of Muhammad in 632.

 Death of Muhammad 
When Muhammad died on 8 June 632 Umar initially disbelieved that he was dead. It is said that Umar promised to strike the head of any man who would say that Muhammad died. Umar said: "He has not died but rather he has gone to his lord just as Moses went, remaining absent from his people for forty nights after which he has returned to them. By Allah, the messenger of Allah will indeed return just as Moses returned (to his people) and he will cut off the hands and legs of those men who claimed he has died." Abu Bakr then publicly spoke to the community in the mosque, saying:
 Abū Bakr then recited these verses from the Qur'an:
 Hearing this, Umar fell on his knees in sorrow and acceptance. Sunni Muslims say that this denial of Muhammad's death was occasioned by his deep love for him.

Foundation of the caliphate

Umar's political capacity first manifested as the architect of the caliphate after Muhammad died on 8 June 632. While the funeral of Muhammad was being arranged a group of Muhammad's followers who were natives of Medina, the Ansar (helpers), organised a meeting on the outskirts of the city, effectively locking out those companions known as Muhajirs (The Emigrants) including Umar. Umar found out about this meeting at Saqifah Bani Saadah, and, taking with him two other Muhajirs, Abu Bakr and Abu Ubaidah ibn al-Jarrah, proceeded to the meeting, presumably to head off the Ansars' plans for political separation. Arriving at the meeting, Umar was faced with a unified community of tribes from the Ansar who refused to accept the leadership of the Muhajirs. However, Umar was undeterred in his belief the caliphate should be under the control of the Muhajirs. Though the Khazraj were in disagreement, Umar, after strained negotiations lasting one or two days, brilliantly divided the Ansar into their old warring factions of Aws and Khazraj tribes. Umar resolved the divisions by placing his hand on that of Abu Bakr as a unity candidate for those gathered in the Saqifah. Others at the Saqifah followed suit, with the exception of the Khazraj tribe and their leader, Sa'd ibn 'Ubada, who were ostracized as a result. The Khazraj tribe is said to have posed no significant threat as there were sufficient men of war from the Medinan tribes such as the Banu Aws to immediately organize them into a military bodyguard for Abu Bakr.

Wilferd Madelung summarises Umar's contribution:

According to various Twelver Shia sources and Madelung,  Umar and Abu Bakr had in effect mounted a political coup against Ali at the Saqifah. According to one version of narrations in primary sources, Umar and Abu Bakr are also said to have used force to try to secure the allegiance from Ali and his party. It has been reported in mainly Persian historical sources written 300 years later, such as in the History of al-Tabari, that after Ali's refusal to pay homage, Abu Bakr sent Umar with an armed contingent to Fatimah's house where Ali and his supporters are said to have gathered. Umar is reported to have warned those in the House that unless Ali succumbed to Abu Bakr, he would set the House on fire and under these circumstances Ali was forced to capitulate. This version of events, fully accepted by Shia scholars, is generally rejected by Sunni scholars who, in view of other reports in their literature, believe that Ali gave an oath of alliance to Abu Bakr without any grievance. But then other Sunni and Shia sources say that Ali did not swear allegiance to Abu Bakr after his election but six months later after the death of his wife Fatimah putting into question al-Tabari's account. Either way the Sunni and the Shia accounts both accept that Ali felt that Abu Bakr should have informed him before going into the meeting with the Ansar and that Ali did swear allegiance to Abu Bakr.

Western scholars tend to agree that Ali believed he had a clear mandate to succeed Muhammad, but offer differing views as to the extent of use of force by Umar in an attempt to intimidate Ali and his supporters. For instance, Madelung discounts the possibility of the use of force and argues that:

According to Tom Holland, Umar's historicity is beyond dispute. An Armenian bishop writing a decade or so after Qadisiyya describes Umar as a "mighty potentate coordinating the advance of the sons of Ismael from the depths of the desert".Sebeos 139 Tom Holland writes "What added incomparably to his prestige, was that his earth-shaking qualities as a generalissimo were combined with the most distinctive cast of virtues. Rather than ape the manner of a Caesar, as the Ghassanid kings had done, he drew on the example of a quite different kind of Christian. Umar's threadbare robes, his diet of bread, salt and water, and his rejection of worldly riches would have reminded anyone from the desert reaches beyond Palestine of a very particular kind of person. Monks out in the Judaean desert had long been casting themselves as warriors of God. The achievement of Umar was to take such language to a literal and previously unimaginable extreme."

Abu Bakr's era
Due to the delicate political situation in Arabia, Umar initially opposed military operations against the rebel tribes there, hoping to gain their support in the event of an invasion by the Romans or the Persians. Later, however, he came to agree with Abu Bakr's strategy to crush the rebellion by force. By late 632 CE, Khalid ibn Walid had successfully united Arabia after consecutive victories against the rebels. During his own reign later, Umar would mostly adopt the policy of avoiding wars and consolidating his power in the incorporated lands rather than expanding his empire through continuous warfare.

Umar advised Abu Bakr to compile the Quran in the form of a book after 300 huffāẓ (memorizers) of the Quran died in the Battle of Yamamah.

Appointment as a caliph
Abu Bakr appointed Umar as his successor before dying in 634 CE. Due to his strict and autocratic nature, Umar was not a very popular figure among the notables of Medina and members of Majlis al Shura; accordingly, high-ranking companions of Abu Bakr attempted to discourage him from naming Umar.K. Y. Blankinship, The History of al-Tabari: vol. XI, p. 157
Nevertheless, Abu Bakr decided to make Umar his successor.
Umar was well known for his extraordinary willpower, intelligence, political astuteness, impartiality, justice, and care for the poor.
Abu Bakr is reported to have said to the high-ranking advisers:

Abu Bakr was aware of Umar's power and ability to succeed him. His was perhaps one of the smoothest transitions of power from one authority to another in the Muslim lands.
Before his death, Abu Bakr called Uthman to write his will in which he declared Umar his successor. In his will he instructed Umar to continue the conquests on Iraqi and Syrian fronts.

Caliphate
Initial challenges

Even though almost all of the Muslims had given their pledge of loyalty to Umar, he was feared more than loved. According to Muhammad Husayn Haykal, the first challenge for Umar was to win over his subjects and the members of Majlis al Shura.

Umar was a gifted orator, and he used his ability to improve his reputation among the people.

Muhammad Husayn Haykal wrote that Umar's stress was on the well-being of the poor and underprivileged.
In addition to this, Umar, in order to improve his reputation and relation with the Banu Hashim, the tribe of Ali, delivered to the latter his disputed estates in Khayber. He followed Abu Bakr's decision over the disputed land of Fidak, continuing to treat it as state property.
In the Ridda wars, thousands of prisoners from rebel and apostate tribes were taken away as slaves during the expeditions. Umar ordered a general amnesty for the prisoners, and their immediate emancipation. This made Umar quite popular among the Bedouin tribes.
With the necessary public support on his side, Umar took the bold decision of recalling Khalid ibn Walid from supreme command on the Roman front.

Political and civil administration

The government of Umar was a unitary government, where the sovereign political authority was the caliph. The empire of Umar was divided into provinces and some autonomous territories, e.g., Azerbaijan and Armenia, that had accepted the suzerainty of the caliphate. The provinces were administered by the provincial governors or Wali, personally and fastidiously selected by Umar. Provinces were further divided into about 100 districts. Each district or main city was under the charge of a junior governor or Amir, usually appointed by Umar himself, but occasionally also appointed by the provincial governor. Other officers at the provincial level were:

 Katib, the Chief Secretary.
 Katib-ud-Diwan, the Military Secretary.
 Sahib-ul-Kharaj, the Revenue Collector.
 Sahib-ul-Ahdath, the Police chief.
 Sahib-Bait-ul-Mal, the Treasury Officer.
 Qadi, the Chief Judge.

In some districts there were separate military officers, though the Wali was, in most cases, the Commander-in-chief of the army quartered in the province.

Every appointment was made in writing. At the time of appointment an instrument of instructions was issued with a view to regulating the Wali's conduct. On assuming office, the Wali was required to assemble the people in the main mosque, and read the instrument of instructions before them.

Umar's general instructions to his officers were:

Various other strict codes of conduct were to be obeyed by the governors and state officials. The principal officers were required to travel to Mecca on the occasion of the Hajj, during which people were free to present any complaint against them. In order to minimize the chances of corruption, Umar made it a point to pay high salaries to the staff. Provincial governors received as much as five to seven thousand dirham annually besides their shares of the spoils of war (if they were also the commander in chief of the army of their sector).
Under Umar the empire was divided into the following provinces:

 Mecca (Arabia)
 Medina (Arabia)
 Basra (Iraq)
 Kufa (Iraq)
 Jazira, in the upper reaches of the Tigris and Euphrates
 Syria
 Iliyā' (إلياء) (Palestine)
 Ramlah (Palestine)
 Upper Egypt
 Lower Egypt
 Khorasan (Persia)
 Azerbaijan (Persia)
 Fars (Persia)

Umar was first to establish a special department for the investigation of complaints against the officers of the State. This department acted as the Administrative court, where the legal proceedings were personally led by Umar.
The department was under the charge of Muhammad ibn Maslamah, one of Umar's most trusted men. In important cases Muhammad ibn Maslamah was deputed by Umar to proceed to the spot, investigate the charge and take action. Sometimes an Inquiry Commission was constituted to investigate the charge. On occasion, the officers against whom complaints were received were summoned to Medina, and charged in Umar's administrative court.
Umar was known for this intelligence service through which he made his officials accountable. This service was also said to have inspired fear in his subjects.

Umar was a pioneer in some affairs:

 Umar was the first to introduce the public ministry system, where the records of officials and soldiers were kept. He also kept a record system for messages he sent to Governors and heads of state.
 He was the first to appoint police forces to keep civil order.
 He was the first to discipline the people when they became disordered.

Another important aspect of Umar's rule was that he forbade any of his governors and agents from engaging in any sort of business dealings whilst in a position of power. An agent of Umar by the name of Al Harith ibn K'ab ibn Wahb was once found to have extra money beyond his salary and Umar enquired about his wealth. Al Harith replied that he had some money and he engaged in trade with it. Umar said: By Allah, we did not send you to engage in trade! and he took from him the profits he had made.

Canals
Since Medina, with a rapidly growing population, was at risk of recurring famines when crops were lacking, Umar sought to facilitate the import of grain. He ordered the building of a canal connecting the Nile to the Red Sea and an improvement of port infrastructure on the Arabian coast. When Basra was established during Umar's rule, he started building a nine-mile canal from the Tigris to the new city for irrigation and drinking water. Al-Tabari reports that Utba ibn Ghazwan built the first canal from the Tigris River to the site of Basra when the city was in the planning stage. After the city was built, Umar appointed Abu Musa Ashaari (17-29/638 – 650) as its first governor. He began building two important canals, the al-Ubulla and the Ma'qil, linking Basra with the Tigris River. These two canals were the basis for the agricultural development for the whole Basra region and used for drinking water. Umar also adopted a policy of assigning barren lands to those who undertook to cultivate them. This policy continued during the Umayyad period and resulted in the cultivation of large areas of barren lands through the construction of irrigation canals by the state and by individuals.

Reforms

Under Umar's leadership, the empire expanded; accordingly, he began to build a political structure that would hold together the vast territory. He undertook many administrative reforms and closely oversaw public policy, establishing an advanced administration for the newly conquered lands, including several new ministries and bureaucracies, and ordered a census of all the Muslim territories. During his rule, the garrison cities (amsar) of Basra and Kufa were founded or expanded. In 638, he extended and renovated the Masjid al-Haram (Grand Mosque) in Mecca and al-Masjid al-Nabawi (Mosque of the Prophet) in Medina.

Umar also ordered the expulsion to Syria and Iraq of the Christian and Jewish communities of Najran and Khaybar. He also permitted Jewish families to resettle in Jerusalem, which had previously been barred from all Jews. He issued orders that these Christians and Jews should be treated well and allotted them the equivalent amount of land in their new settlements. Umar also forbade non-Muslims from residing in the Hejaz for longer than three days. He was first to establish the army as a state department.

Umar was founder of Fiqh, or Islamic jurisprudence. He is regarded by Sunni Muslims as one of the greatest Faqih, and, as such, he started the process of codifying Islamic Law.

In 641, he established Bayt al-mal, a financial institution and started annual allowances for the Muslims.
As a leader, Umar was known for his simple, austere lifestyle. Rather than adopt the pomp and display affected by the rulers of the time, he continued to live much as he had when Muslims were poor and persecuted. In 638, his fourth year as caliph and the seventeenth year since the Hijra, he decreed that the Islamic calendar should be counted from the year of the Hijra of Muhammad from Mecca to Medina.

Visit to Jerusalem in 637 CE
Umar's visit to Jerusalem is documented in several sources. A recently discovered Judeo-Arabic text has disclosed the following anecdote:

"Umar ordered Gentiles and a group of Jews to sweep the area of the Temple Mount. Umar oversaw the work. The Jews who had come sent letters to the rest of the Jews in Palestine and informed them that Umar had permitted resettlement of Jerusalem by Jews. Umar, after some consultation, permitted seventy Jewish households to return. They returned to live in the southern part of the city, i.e., the Market of the Jews. (Their aim was to be near the water of Silwan and the Temple Mount and its gates). Then the Commander Umar granted them this request. The seventy families moved to Jerusalem from Tiberias and the area around it with their wives and children."

It is also reported in the name of the Alexandrian Bishop Eutychius (932–940 CE) that the rock known as the Temple Mount had been a place of ruins as far back as the time of the Empress Helena, mother of Constantine the Great, who built churches in Jerusalem. "The Byzantines," he said, "had deliberately left the ancient site of the Temple as it was, and had even thrown rubbish on it, so that a great heap of rubble formed." It was only when Umar marched into Jerusalem with an army that he asked Kaab, who was Jewish before he converted to Islam, "Where do you advise me to build a place of worship?" Kaab indicated the Temple Rock, now a gigantic heap of ruins from the temple of Jupiter. The Jews, Kaab explained, had briefly won back their old capital a quarter of a century before (when Persians overran Syria and Palestine), but they had not had time to clear the site of the Temple, for the Rums (Byzantines) had recaptured the city. It was then that Umar ordered the rubbish on the Ṣakhra (rock) to be removed by the Nabataeans, and after three showers of heavy rain had cleansed the Rock, he instituted prayers there. To this day, the place is known as ḳubbat es ṣakhra, the Dome of the Rock.

According to lexicographer David ben Abraham al-Fasi (died before 1026 CE), the Muslim conquest of Palestine brought relief to the country's Jewish citizens, who had previously been barred by the Byzantines from praying on the Temple Mount.

Military expansion

The military conquests were partially terminated between 638 and 639 during the years of great famine in Arabia and plague in the Levant. During his reign the Levant, Egypt, Cyrenaica, Tripolitania, Fezzan, Eastern Anatolia, almost the whole of the Sassanid Persian Empire including Bactria, Persia, Azerbaijan, Armenia, Caucasus and Makran were annexed to the Rashidun Caliphate. According to one estimate more than 4,050 cities were captured during these military conquests. Prior to his death in 644, Umar had ceased all military expeditions apparently to consolidate his rule in recently conquered Roman Egypt and the newly conquered Sassanid Empire (642–644). At his death in November 644, his rule extended from present day Libya in the west to the Indus river in the east and the Oxus river in the north.

Great famine
In 638 CE, Arabia fell into severe drought followed by a famine. Soon after, the reserves of food at Medina began to run out. Umar ordered caravans of supplies from Syria and Iraq, and personally supervised their distribution. His actions saved countless lives throughout Arabia. The first governor to respond was Abu Ubaidah ibn al-Jarrah, the governor of Syria and supreme commander of the Rashidun army.

Later, Abu Ubaidah paid a personal visit to Medina and acted as an officer of disaster management, which was headed personally by Umar. For internally displaced people, Umar hosted a dinner every night at Medina, which according to one estimate, had attendance of more than a hundred thousand people.

Great plague

While famine was ending in Arabia, many districts in Syria and Palestine were devastated by plague. While Umar was on his way to visit Syria, at Elat, he was received by Abu Ubaidah ibn al-Jarrah, governor of Syria, who informed him about the plague and its intensity, and suggested that Umar go back to Medina. Umar tried to persuade Abu Ubaidah to come with him to Medina, but he declined to leave his troops in that critical situation. Abu Ubaidah died in 639 of the plague, which also cost the lives of 25,000 Muslims in Syria. After the plague had weakened, in late 639, Umar visited Syria for political and administrative re-organization, as most of the veteran commanders and governors had died of the plague.

Welfare state

To be close to the poor, Umar lived in a simple mud hut without doors and walked the streets every evening. After consulting with the poor, Umar established the first welfare state, Bayt al-mal. The Bayt al-mal aided the Muslim and non-Muslim poor, needy, elderly, orphans, widows, and the disabled. The Bayt al-mal ran for hundreds of years, from the Rashidun Caliphate in the 7th century through the Umayyad period (661–750) and well into the Abbasid era. Umar also introduced a child benefit and pensions for the children and the elderly.The challenge of Islamic renaissance By Syed Abdul Quddus

Free trade

Local populations of Jews and Christians, persecuted as religious minorities and taxed heavily to finance the Byzantine–Sassanid Wars, often aided Muslims to take over their lands from the Byzantines and Persians, resulting in exceptionally speedy conquests. As new areas were attached to the Caliphate, they also benefited from free trade, while trading with other areas in the Caliphate (to encourage commerce, in Islam trade is not taxed, but wealth is subject to the zakat). Since the Constitution of Medina, drafted by Muhammad, the Jews and the Christians continued to use their own laws in the Caliphate and had their own judges.Watt. Muhammad at Medina and R. B. Serjeant "The Constitution of Medina." Islamic Quarterly 8 (1964) p.4.

Assassination

In 644, Umar was assassinated by a Persian slave named Abu Lu'lu'a Firuz. His motivation for the assassination is not clear, but medieval sources attribute it to a tax dispute with his Arab master al-Mughira ibn Shu'ba.

According to some historical accounts, Abu Lu'lu'a was a Zoroastrian from Nahavand (Iran), though other reports describe him as a Christian. A highly skilled joiner and blacksmith, Abu Lu'lu'a was probably taken captive by his master al-Mughira in the Battle of Nahavand (642) and subsequently brought to Arabia, where he may also have converted to Islam. Other historical sources report that he was rather taken captive by al-Mughira in the Battle of al-Qadisiyya (636), or that he was sold to al-Mughira by Hurmuzān, an ex-Sassanid military officer who had been working for Umar as an adviser after his own capture by the Muslims.

When al-Mughira forced Abu Lu'lu'a to pay a  tax of two dirhams a day, Abu Lu'lu'a turned to Umar to protest this tax. However, Umar refused to lift the tax, thus provoking Abu Lu'lu'a's rage. Although this is the reason given by most historical accounts for Abu Lu'lu'a's assassination of Umar, Umar's biased policies against non-Arab captives may also have played a prominent role. One day when Umar was leading the congregational prayer in the mosque of Medina, Abu Lu'lu'a stabbed him with a double-bladed dagger. There are different versions of how this happened: according to one version, he also killed Kulayb ibn al-Bukayr al-Laythi who was behind Umar, while in another version he stabbed thirteen people who tried to restrain him. According to some accounts, the caliph died on the same day, while other accounts maintain that he died three days later.

Some historical sources report that Abu Lu'lu'a was taken prisoner and executed for his assassination of Umar, while other sources claim that he committed suicide. After Abu Lu'lu'a's death, his daughter was killed by Ubayd Allah ibn Umar, one of Umar's sons. Acting upon the claim of one man (either Abd al-Rahman ibn Awf or Abd al-Rahman ibn Abi Bakr) that they had been seen conspiring with Abu Lu'lu'a while he was holding the double-bladed dagger, Ubayd Allah also killed Hurmuzān (Umar's Persian military adviser), and Jufayna, a Christian man from al-Hira (Iraq) who had been taken to Medina to serve as a private tutor to a family in Medina. After Ubayd Allah was detained for these murders, he threatened to kill all foreign captives residing in Medina, as well as some others. Although Ubayd Allah may have been encouraged by his sister Hafsa bint Umar to avenge their father's death, his murder of Hurmuzān and Jufayna was likely the result of a mental breakdown rather than of a true conspiracy. It was regarded by his peers as a crime rather than as a legitimate act of retaliation.

In early 20th-century scholarship it was sometimes supposed that Abu Lu'lu'a had really been an instrument in the hands of a conspiracy, though not a conspiracy led by Hurmuzān, but rather one led by Ali, al-Zubayr ibn al-Awwam, and Talha ibn Ubayd Allah. These men, who according to the historical sources were appointed by Umar himself as members of the council who would elect the next caliph, were thought by scholars to have conspired to overthrow Umar's reign and to put Ali in his place. This hypothesis, however, is rejected by more recent scholars. Nevertheless, while Ubayd Allah was subsequently acquitted of his crimes by Umar's successor Uthman (r. 644–656), who considered the execution of Ubayd Allah an excessive measure in view of his father's recent assassination, Ali, among others, did protest against this and vowed to apply the regular punishment for murder if he were ever to be caliph.

Umar was buried at the Green Dome in al-Masjid al-Nabawi alongside Muhammad and the caliph Abu Bakr, by the permission of Aisha given to his son Abdullah ibn Umar on Umar's request.

Aftermath
On his deathbed, Umar vacillated on his succession. However, it has been reported that he said that if Abu Ubaidah ibn al-Jarrah, Khalid ibn Walid or Salim, the mawla and freed Persian slave, were alive he would have appointed one of them his successor. Umar finally appointed a committee of six persons to choose a caliph from amongst them: Abdur Rahman bin Awf, Saad ibn Abi Waqqas, Talha ibn Ubaidullah, Uthman ibn Affan, Ali ibn Abi Talib and Zubayr ibn al-Awwam.

All six are among the ten to whom Paradise was promised according to Sunnis. The only one out of the 'famous ten' left out of the committee who was still alive at the time was Saeed ibn Zaid, the cousin and brother-in-law of Umar. He was excluded on the basis of being related by blood and of the same tribe as Umar. Umar had a policy of not appointing anyone related to him to a position of authority even if they were qualified by his standards.

Umar appointed a band of fifty armed soldiers to protect the house where the meeting was proceeding.
Until the appointment of the next caliph, Umar appointed a notable Sahabi and mawla, Suhayb ar-Rumi (Suhayb the Roman), as a caretaker caliph.
While the meeting for selection of a caliph was proceeding, Abdulrehman ibn Abu Bakr and Abdur Rahman bin Awf revealed that they saw the dagger used by Abu Lu'lu'a, the assassin of Umar. A night before Umar's assassination, reported Abdur Rahman bin Awf, he saw Hurmuzan, Jafina and Abu Lu'lu'a, while they were suspiciously discussing something. Surprised by his presence, the dagger fell; it was the same two-sided dagger used in the assassination. Abdulrehman ibn Abu Bakr, son of the late caliph Abu Bakr, confirmed that, a few days before Umar's assassination, he saw this dagger in Hurmuzan's possession. After this revelation, it seemed clear that it had been planned by the Persians residing in Medina. Infuriated by this, Umar's younger son Ubaidullah ibn Umar sought to kill all the Persians in Medina. He killed Hurmuzan, Jafinah, and the daughter of Umar's assassin Abu Lu'lu'a, who is believed to have been a Muslim. Ubaidullah was intercepted by the people of Medina, who prevented him from continuing the massacre. Amr ibn al-Aas is said to have intercepted him and convinced him to hand over his sword. The murder of Jafinah enraged Saad ibn Abi Waqqas, his foster brother, and he assaulted Ubaidullah ibn Umar; again the companions intervened. When Umar was informed about the incident, he ordered Ubaidullah imprisoned, and that the next caliph should decide his fate.

Umar died on 3 November 644; on 7 November Uthman succeeded him as caliph. After prolonged negotiations, the tribunal decided to give blood money to the victims, and released Umar's son Ubaidullah on the ground that, after the tragedy of Umar's assassination, people would be further infuriated by the execution of his son the very next day.

Physical appearance
Umar was strong, fit, athletic and good at wrestling. He is said to have participated in the wrestling matches on the occasion of the annual fair of Ukaz. From first hand accounts of his physical appearance Umar is said to be vigorous, robust and a very tall man; in markets he would tower above the people. The front part of his head was bald, always A'sara Yusran (working with two hands), both his eyes were black, with yellow skin; however, ibn Sa'ad in his book stated that he never knew that Umar had yellow skin, except for a certain part of Umar's life where his color changed due to his frequent consumption of oil. Others say he had reddish-white skin. His teeth were ashnabul asnan (very white shining). He would always color his beard and take care of his hair using a type of plant.History of the Prophets and Kings (Tarikh ar-Rusul wa al-Muluk) 4/ 196 by Muhammad ibn Jarir al-Tabari

The early Muslim historians Ibn Saad and al-Hakim mention that Abu Miriam Zir, a native of Kufa, described Umar as being "advanced in years, bald, of a tawny colour – a left handed man, tall and towering above the people". Umar's eldest son Abdullah described his father as "a man of fair complexion, a ruddy tint prevailing, tall, bald and grey". Historian Salima bin al-Akwa'a said that "Umar was ambidextrous, he could use both his hands equally well". On the authority of Abu Raja al-U'taridi, Ibn Asakir records that "Umar was a man tall, stout, very bald, very ruddy with scanty hair on the cheeks, his moustaches large, and the ends thereof reddish".

Assessments and legacy

 Political legacy 
Umar was the first caliph to adopt the title . Umar was one of Muhammad's chief advisers. After Muhammad's passing, it was Umar who reconciled the Medinan Muslims to accept Abu Bakr, a Meccan, as the caliph. During Abu Bakr's era, he actively participated as his secretary and main adviser. After succeeding Abu Bakr as caliph, Umar won over the hearts of Bedouin tribes by emancipating all their prisoners and slaves taken during the Ridda wars.

He built up an efficient administrative structure that held together his vast realm. He organized an effective intelligence network, one of the reasons for his strong grip on his bureaucracy.

Umar never appointed governors for more than two years, for they might amass too much local power. He dismissed his most successful general, Khalid ibn Walid, because he wanted people to know that it is Allah who grants victory, and to counter the cult of personality that had built up around Khalid, for the sake of the Muslim faith.

He would patrol the streets of Medina with a whip in his hand, ready to punish any offenders he might come across. It is said that Umar's whip was feared more than the sword of another man. But with all of this, he was also known for being kindhearted, answering the needs of the fatherless and widows.

Umar's swift imposition of justice against his governors for misdeeds made even powerful governors such as Muawiyah scared of him. Ali ibn Abu Talib, during the later rule of Uthman ibn Affan, wanted Uthman to be more strict with his governors, saying, "I adjure you by God, do you know that Mu'awiyah was more afraid of Umar than was Umar's own servant Yarfa?"

Under Umar's rule, in order to promote strict discipline, Arab soldiers were settled outside of cities, between the desert and cultivated lands in special garrison towns known as "amsar". Known examples of such settlements are Basra and Kufa, in Iraq, and Fustat south of what would later become Cairo. His soldiers were forbidden to own land outside of Arabia. There were restrictions on their right to seize buildings and other immovable things usually thought of as prizes of war. Movable spoils were shared with the people of the umma, regardless of their social stratum.

A modern researcher writes about this:

In The Decline and Fall of the Roman Empire, Gibbon refers to Umar in the following terms:

His rule was one of the few moments in the history of Islam where Muslims were united as a single community. Abdullah ibn Masʿud would often weep whenever the subject of Umar was brought up. He said: "Umar was a fortress of Islam. People would enter Islam and not leave. When he died, the fortress was breached and now people are going out of Islam". Abu Ubaidah ibn al-Jarrah before Umar died famously said: "If Umar dies, Islam would be weakened". People asked him why and his reply was "You will see what I am speaking about if you survive."
His greatest achievement from a religious perspective was the compilation of the Qur'an. This had not been done during the time of Muhammad. However, during the Battle of Yamama a great number of the memorizers of the Quran perished in the battle. On the advice of Umar, Abu Bakr tasked Zayd ibn Thabit with the momentous task of compiling the Quran into a single Book.

Military legacy

Along with Khalid ibn Walid, Umar was influential in the Ridda wars.

One strategic success was his sundering of the Byzantine-Sassanid alliance in 636, when Emperor Heraclius and Emperor Yazdegerd III allied against their common enemy. He was lucky in that the Persian Emperor Yazdegerd III couldn't synchronize with Heraclius as planned. Umar fully availed himself of the opportunity by inducing the Byzantines to act prematurely. This was contrary to the orders of Emperor Heraclius, who presumably wanted a coordinated attack along with the Persians. Umar did this by sending reinforcements to the Roman front in the Battle of Yarmouk, with instructions that they should appear in the form of small bands, one after the other, giving the impression of a continuous stream of reinforcements that finally lured the Byzantines to an untimely battle. On the other hand, Yazdegerd III was engaged in negotiations that further gave Umar time to transfer his troops from Syria to Iraq. These troops proved decisive in the Battle of Qadisiyyah.

His strategy resulted in a Muslim victory at the Second Battle of Emesa in 638, where the pro-Byzantine Christian Arabs of Jazira, aided by the Byzantine Emperor, made an unexpected flanking movement and laid siege to Emesa (Homs).

Umar issued an order to invade the very homeland of the Christian Arab forces besieging Emesa, the Jazirah. A three-pronged attack against Jazirah was launched from Iraq. To further pressure the Christian Arab armies, Umar instructed Saad ibn Abi Waqqas, commander of Muslim forces in Iraq, to send reinforcements to Emesa. Umar himself led reinforcements there from Medina. Under this unprecedented pressure, the Christian Arabs retreated from Emesa before Muslim reinforcements could arrive. The Muslims annexed Mesopotamia and parts of Byzantine Armenia.

After the Battle of Nahavand, Umar launched a full-scale invasion of the Sassanid Persian Empire. The invasion was a series of well-coordinated multi-pronged attacks designed to isolate and destroy their targets. Umar launched the invasion by attacking the very heart of Persia, aiming to isolate Azerbaijan and eastern Persia. This was immediately followed by simultaneous attacks on Azerbaijan and Fars. Next, Sistan and Kirman were captured, thus isolating the stronghold of Persia, the Khurasan. The final expedition was launched against Khurasan, where, after the Battle of Oxus River, the Persian empire ceased to exist, and Yazdegerd III fled to Central Asia.

Religious legacy

Sunni views

Umar is remembered by Sunnis as a rigid Muslim of a sound and just disposition in matters of religion; a man they title Fārūq, meaning "leader, jurist and statesman", and the second of the rightly guided caliphs. He patched his clothes with skin, took buckets on his two shoulders, always riding his donkey without the saddle, rarely laughing and never joking with anyone. On his ring is written the words "Enough is Death as a reminder to you O' Umar". He did not seek advancement for his own family, but rather sought to advance the interests of the Muslim community, the ummah. According to one of Muhammad's companions, Abd Allah ibn Mas'ud:

Shia views

Umar is viewed very negatively in the literature of Twelver Shi'a (the main branch of Shia Islam) and is often regarded as a usurper of Ali's right to the Caliphate. After the Saqifah assembly chose Abu Bakr as caliph, Umar marched with armed men to Ali's house in order to get the allegiance of Ali and his supporters. Sources indicate that a threat was made to burn Ali's house if he refused, but the encounter ended when Fatimah, wife of Ali, intervened. According to the majority of Twelver scholar writings, Fatimah was physically assaulted by Umar, that this caused her to miscarry her child, Muhsin ibn Ali, and led to her death soon after. (see Umar at Fatimah's house). However, some Twelver scholars, such as Fadhlalla, reject these accounts of physical abuse as a "myth", although Fadlallah mentioned that his speech is a probability, and not a certain reason to reject that event.

Another Shia sect, the Zaidiyyah followers of Zaid ibn Ali, generally has two views about that. Some branches, such as Jaroudiah (Sarhubiyya), don't accept Umar and Abu Bakr as legitimate caliphs. For instance, Jarudiyya believes that Muhammad appointed Ali and believes that the denial of the Imamate of Ali after Muhammad's passing would lead to infidelity and deviation from the right path. The other view accepts Umar and Abu Bakr as legitimate caliphs, albeit inferior to Ali. According to al-Tabari (and Ibn A'tham), when asked about Abu Bakr and Umar, Zayd ibn Ali replied: "I have not heard anyone in my family renouncing them both nor saying anything but good about them...when they were entrusted with government they behaved justly with the people and acted according to the Qur'an and the Sunnah.".The Encyclopedia of Religion Vol. 16, Mircea Eliade, Charles J. Adams, Macmillan, 1987, p. 243. "They were called "Rafida by the followers of Zayd"

Family

Umar married nine women in his lifetime and had fourteen children: ten sons and four daughters.

Wives
The known wives of Umar are:
 Zaynab bint Maz'un, she was the mother of Hafsa, Abd Allah and Abd al-Rahman al-Akbar.
 Umm Kulthum bint Jarwal, she was divorced by Umar. She was the mother of Ubayd Allah and Zayd al-Asghar.
 Qurayba bint Abi Umayya, divorced by Umar in 628.
 Jamila bint Thabit, She married Umar about between May 627 and May 628. They had one son, Asim.Ibn Saad/Bewley vol. 3 p. 204.
 Atiqa bint Zayd, she was married to Umar and had a son named Iyad.
 Umm Hakim bint al-Harith ibn Hisham, She was married to Umar in 634 and was mother of Fatima.
 Umm Kulthum bint Ali from this marriage Umar had a son named Zayd and a daughter named Ruqayya. This is, however, the Sunni view. The Shi'a do not accept that such a marriage took place. In fact, even some Sunnis scholars maintain that Umar's wife Umm Kulthum was actually Abu Bakr's daughter who was raised in Ali's house.
Sons
The sons of Umar are:
 Abd Allah, son of Zaynab bint Maz'un.
 Abd al-Rahman, son of Zaynab bint Maz'un.
 Zayd, son of Umm Kulthum bint Ali.
 Ubayd Allah, son of Umm Kulthum bint Jarwal.
 Zayd, son of Umm Kulthum bint Jarwal.
 Asim, son of Jamila bint Thabit.
 Iyad, son of Atiqa bint Zayd.
 Abd al-Rahman Abu'l-Mujabbar
 Abd al-Rahman "Abu Shahmah" ibn Umar
 Abd Allah
Daughters
The daughters of Umar are:
 Hafsa, daughter of Zaynab bint Maz'un.
 Fatima, daughter of Umm Hakim bint al-Harith ibn Hisham.
 Ruqayya, daughter of Umm Kulthum bint Ali.
 Zaynab

Archeological evidence

In 2012, an inscription was found on a rock in al-Murakkab (Saudi Arabia) which is thought to be an autograph of Umar's signature.

See also
 Al-Farooq, modern biography about Umar
 Omar ibn al-Khattab Mosque, is a historic mosque in Dumat al-Jandal in northern Arabia, it was built by Umar.
 Al Farooq Omar Bin Al Khattab Mosque, mosque named for him in Dubai
 Sahaba
 Farooqi
 Omar (TV series)
 Pact of Umar
 Umar ibn Ibrahim ibn Waqid al-Umari

References

 Notes 

Bibliography

 

 Guillaume, A., The Life of Muhammad, Oxford University Press, 1955.
 Previte-Orton, C. W. (1971). The Shorter Cambridge Medieval History. Cambridge: Cambridge University Press.
 Donner, Fred, The Early Islamic Conquests'', Princeton University Press, 1981.

External links

 Excerpt from The History of the Khalifahs by Jalal ad-Din as-Suyuti
 Sirah of Amirul Muminin Umar Bin Khattab by Shaykh Sayyed Muhammad bin Yahya al-Husayni al-Ninowy.
 

 
584 births
644 deaths
Arab Muslims
7th-century caliphs
7th-century murdered monarchs
Assassinated caliphs
Deaths by blade weapons
Male murder victims
People of the Muslim conquest of Persia
Rashidun caliphs
Sahabah who participated in the battle of Uhud
Shahnameh characters
Burials at Al-Masjid an-Nabawi